The White Limestone School is located in Mayville, Wisconsin.

History
The school was constructed from 1858 to 1957 to replace the previous one and serve the city's growing population. During the 1870s, with the population still growing, major additions built. During various times in the school's history, it taught all grades ranging from kindergarten through all four years of high school. The building ceased being used as a school in 1981. It has since been converted into a museum.

References

School buildings on the National Register of Historic Places in Wisconsin
National Register of Historic Places in Dodge County, Wisconsin
Public high schools in Wisconsin
Public middle schools in Wisconsin
Public elementary schools in Wisconsin
Schools in Dodge County, Wisconsin
Defunct schools in Wisconsin
History museums in Wisconsin
Museums in Dodge County, Wisconsin
Greek Revival architecture in Wisconsin
Limestone buildings in the United States
School buildings completed in 1858